ZPG may stand for:
Zero population growth, a condition of demographic balance where population remains constant over time
Zero Population Growth, the former name of the organisation Population Connection
zpg, the ISO 639-3 code for the Guevea De Humboldt Zapotec language
Z.P.G., a 1972 science fiction film
ZPG-3W, a non-rigid airship built by the Goodyear Aircraft Company
 ZPG plc, a property business